Slatington station was a Lehigh Valley Railroad station in Slatington, Pennsylvania, located on the Lehigh Valley main line. The station also served the Lehigh and New England Railroad; the Reading Company at one time had an adjacent station. The Central Railroad of New Jersey had an unconnected station across the Lehigh River in Walnutport, Pennsylvania.

The Lehigh Valley opened its first station in Slatington in 1856. A second, larger station building replaced it in 1863. A third and final station, made of brick, opened circa 1877.

Passenger service to Slatington ended on February 4, 1961, with the end of all passenger service on the Lehigh Valley. The station was badly damaged by a Lehigh Valley derailment on February 1, 1969, and demolished shortly thereafter.

Notes

Footnotes

References 
 
 
 

Former Lehigh Valley Railroad stations
Demolished railway stations in the United States
Railway stations in the United States opened in 1856
Railway stations closed in 1961